Nearmap (officially Nearmap Pty Ltd) is an aerial technology company headquartered in Australia that provides frequently-updated, high-resolution aerial imagery and location intelligence on up to 95% of Australia's population, 80% of the United States population, 75% of the New Zealand population, and 66% of Canada's population. It was a publicly traded company on the Australian Securities Exchange until being taken private by Thoma Bravo in 2022.

History 
Nearmap was founded in Perth, Western Australia, by Stuart Nixon in 2008. Nearmap's first capture of aerial imagery dates back to 2007.

In 2012, the business was acquired by an ASX-listed company Ipernica and becoming the primary entity. Nearmap then moved its headquarters from Perth to Sydney. In 2014, the company expanded into the United States market. In 2017, Nearmap expanded its capture program and surveyed New Zealand's top 13 most populated cities, including Queenstown. The same year, Nearmap expanded its aerial imaging content to provide 3D models of Australia's major capital cities. The business now offers Digital Service Model (DSM) and textured mesh data sets for bespoke download.

In May 2021, EagleView Technologies and Pictometry International accused Nearmap of infringing their patents covering roof estimation technology. CEO Newman dismissed the patent infringement suit and said the allegations were without merit.

Business

Concept 

Historically, aerial imagery was available mainly to government and large enterprises, as it was quite an expensive and long process. First, a surveying company had to be engaged to take photos of a certain area of interest. Then, the data would be manually processed and stitched together digitally to create aerial maps. Imagery was then delivered on a hard disk. The entire process could take months and was repeated once every few years at best.

Nearmap disrupted this model by creating a patented camera system and software pipeline that enables the company to capture aerial photos, stitch them together into seamless digital maps, and publish the content online within days of capture.

With the cost of capture significantly lower than anything else on the market, Nearmap can update surveys more frequently and at a much lower cost. Its subscription model has effectively made high-quality aerial imagery available to a far wider swath of businesses and government organizations. Nearmap captures aerial images frequently, up to six times a year in urban centres, at a resolution of 5.8–7.5 cm per pixel or better.

By capturing aerial images with airplanes (as opposed to with satellites), Nearmap is able to solve for potential weather or atmospheric obstructions. The images are quickly processed and streamed to the cloud in a matter of days, where they are available for viewing and analysis on desktop, tablet, and mobile devices.

Nearmap provides its high-resolution aerial imagery content as a subscription service to a broad base of customers from diverse industries including construction, engineering, urban planning, insurance, solar, telecom, utilities, and government entities across local, state, and federal agencies. Subscribers use Nearmap to remotely inspect locations for better informed planning and monitoring; evaluate properties and infrastructural assets; and understand historical context at their locations of interest.

Nearmap serves over 11,200 businesses and organisations globally.

Product 
Nearmap provides many types of content including Vertical, Panorama, Measurable Obliques, 3D, Artificial Intelligence and Roof Geometry.

Vertical imagery is also known as orthorectified, providing a top-down view of the ground captured at a 90° angle. Orthorectification is a process used to correct the terrain distortion in aerial or satellite images that results from variations in the surface of the Earth and tilt of the satellite or aerial sensor being used to collect the data. This process allows accurate information to be gathered from the images such as distances, angles, and positions.

The Nearmap Panorama product provides a seamless mosaic view of locations and features from all four cardinal directions in a single viewing experience. Circumventing the need to switch from one image to another to view content from multiple perspectives, Nearmap Panorama allows users to pan and zoom across a large footprint uninterrupted, allowing information to be reviewed much more quickly.

Nearmap's Measurable Obliques allow users to make accurate height measurements of buildings and other ground features. Users can then export these images with the measurements and annotations included, allowing multiple stakeholders to communicate with accurate detail to an entire project team.

Nearmap aerial imagery is delivered through an easy-to-use cloud-based interface called MapBrowser™ or through API integrations. The MapBrowser web application allows users to easily switch base layers from Vertical to Panorama or Measurable Obliques content. It also allows users to navigate and search Nearmap's library of current and historical content, and includes tools for measuring and analyzing locations. Nearmap's APIs offer integration with Esri® ArcGIS, Autodesk, CAMA systems, and other leading GIS and CAD applications via standard industry protocols including WMS, WMTS, and TMS. Along with current imagery, Nearmap's online archive offers an extensive gallery of historical imagery; as of 2023, up to 15 years of photographic maps were available for some parts of Australia.

External links

References 

GIS companies
Companies based in Sydney
Companies listed on the Australian Securities Exchange
2022 mergers and acquisitions
Private equity portfolio companies